The Shantou–Kunming Expressway, designated as G78 and commonly referred to as the Shankun Expressway is an expressway in China that connects the cities of Shantou, Guangdong, and Kunming, Yunnan. When complete, it will be  in length.

Route

Guangdong
In Guangdong, the expressway is complete only from Shantou to Longchuan County. Sections from Longchuan County to Huaiji County is under construction.

Guangxi
The expressway is complete from Pingle County to the Guangdong border and from Liuzhou to Yizhou.

Guizhou
The entire portion in Guizhou is under construction.

Yunnan
The expressway is complete only from Shilin Yi Autonomous County to Kunming.

References

Chinese national-level expressways
Expressways in Guangdong
Expressways in Guangxi
Expressways in Guizhou
Expressways in Yunnan